"Off to See the World" is a song by Danish pop and soul band Lukas Graham. It was released on 5 October 2017 as the second single from the animated film My Little Pony: The Movie soundtrack. The song was written by Christopher Brown, Lukas Forchhammer, Morten Jensen, Stefan Forrest, Morten Pilegaard and David Labrel. The song peaked at number 9 on the Danish Singles Chart and was later used in an episode of NBC's Better Late Than Never.

Track listing

Charts

Weekly charts

Release history

References 

2017 singles
2017 songs
2010s ballads
Lukas Graham songs
RCA Records singles
Warner Records singles
Songs written for animated films
Songs written by Stefan Forrest
Songs written by Lukas Forchhammer
Songs written for films